Ugland may refer to:

 J. J. Ugland, a group of shipping companies based in Grimstad, Norway
 Karl Ugland, a Norwegian politician for the Liberal Party of Norway
 Ugland House, a building located in George Town, Cayman Islands
 Andreas Ugland, a shipping magnate based in George Town, Cayman Islands